Egy may be:
 the ISO 639 code for the Egyptian language
an abbreviation of Egypt

See also 
 Eggy (disambiguation)
 Egi (disambiguation)
 Quartetto Egie